Lare may refer to:
 Lare (Ethiopian District)
 the Lare dialect of the Gallong language, spoken in Northeast India
 Larré, Morbihan, known in Breton as Lare, a commune in France
 , a village in Gassam Department, Burkina Faso

People with the name 
 Aron van Lare (born 2003), Dutch footballer
 Frank E. Van Lare (1900–1971), American businessman and politician
 Jeff LaRe (born 1976), American politician
 Laré Mohamed Diarra, Burkina Faso footballer
 William Bedford Van Lare, Ghanaian jurist and diplomat

See also 
 Lares (disambiguation)
 Larre (disambiguation)
 Lair (disambiguation)
 Lari (disambiguation)
 Laer